The , also known as Wuji li, was a Japanese lunisolar calendar (genka reki).  It was developed in China; and it was used in Japan in the mid-9th century.

History
The  Goki-reki system corrected errors in the Taien calendar which was used in Japan in the first half of the 9th century. The corrections were the work of Akasuga Manomaro.

See also
 Japanese calendar
 Sexagenary cycle

References

Further reading
 Charlotte von Verschuer (1985).  Les relations officielles du Japon avec la Chine aux VIIIe et IXe siècles (Hachi-kyū-seiki no Nitchū kankei), pp. 243-245 n. 114.

External links
 National Diet Library, "The Japanese Calendar"

Specific calendars
History of science and technology in Japan
Time in Japan